Carrie Neely (January 24, 1876 – November 29, 1938)  was an American tennis player from the beginning of the 20th century.

Biography
Carrie Neely was educated at the Dearborn Seminary, Chicago.

Tennis career
In 1907, she reached the women's singles All Comer's final of the U.S. Women's National Championship, where she was beaten by Evelyn Sears.

She also won the mixed doubles in 1898, and won the women's doubles on three occasions (1903, 1905 and 1907).

At the tournament now known as the Cincinnati Masters, she reached the singles final in 1915, the semifinals in 1902, 1903, 1904 and 1912, and the quarterfinals in 1901 and 1916. She paired with Winona Closterman to win the doubles title in 1902 and 1903, and teamed with Closterman again in 1904 to reach the doubles final. She won the mixed doubles title with Nat Emerson in 1903, and paired with Kreigh Collins, also of Chicago, to reach the mixed doubles final in 1901.

Neely won the Niagara International Tennis Tournament in 1902.

Grand Slam finals

Singles (1 runner-up)
,

Doubles (3 titles, 3 runners-up)

Mixed doubles (1 title, 1 runner-up)

References
From Club Court to Center Court by Phillip S. Smith (2008 Edition)

1870s births
American female tennis players
United States National champions (tennis)
Grand Slam (tennis) champions in women's doubles
Grand Slam (tennis) champions in mixed doubles
1938 deaths
Year of birth uncertain
Tennis people from Illinois